The 2014–15 Auburn Tigers men's basketball team represented Auburn University during the 2014–15 NCAA Division I men's basketball season. The team's head coach was Bruce Pearl, in his first season at Auburn. The team played their home games at the Auburn Arena in Auburn, Alabama as a member of the Southeastern Conference. They finished the season 15–20, 4–14 in SEC play to finish in 13th place. They advanced to the semifinals of the SEC tournament where they lost to Kentucky.

Departures

Incoming Transfers

Recruits

Roster

Schedule and results
Source: 

|-
!colspan=9 style="background:#172240; color:#FE3300;"| Exhibition

|-
!colspan=9 style="background:#172240; color:#FE3300;"| Non-conference games

|-
!colspan=9 style="background:#172240; color:#FE3300;"| Conference games

|-
!colspan=9 style="background:#172240; color:#FE3300;" | SEC Tournament

References

Auburn Tigers men's basketball seasons
Auburn
Auburn
Auburn